Dalnevostochnoye is a rural locality (a selo) and the administrative center of Dalnevostochny Selsoviet of Romnensky District, Amur Oblast, Russia. The population was 250 as of 2018. There are 11 streets.

Geography 
Dalnevostochnoye is located 47 km southwest of Romny (the district's administrative centre) by road. Grigoryevka is the nearest rural locality.

References 

Rural localities in Romnensky District